John Morris is a former lawn bowls competitor for New Zealand.

At the 1958 British Empire and Commonwealth Games in Cardiff he won the men's pairs gold medal partnering Richard Pilkington.

References

New Zealand male bowls players
Commonwealth Games gold medallists for New Zealand
Bowls players at the 1958 British Empire and Commonwealth Games
Living people
Year of birth missing (living people)
Commonwealth Games medallists in lawn bowls
20th-century New Zealand people
Medallists at the 1958 British Empire and Commonwealth Games